Aaron James Ramsey may refer to:

 Aaron Ramsey (born 1990), Welsh association football player
 Aaron Ramsey (footballer, born 2003) (born 2003), English association football player